Deer Lake is a lake in King County, Washington.  It is an expansion of the Taylor River, located just below its true source.  Located a short distance downstream is Snoqualmie Lake.

The lake is reached by hiking 1 mile from Snoqualmie Lake.  Deer and Bear Lake are both about the same size.

The river drops over a small waterfall just before flowing into the lake.  Shortly below the outlet is a long cascade that likely extends much of the way to Snoqualmie Lake.

See also
List of lakes in Washington

References 

Lakes of King County, Washington
Mount Baker-Snoqualmie National Forest